"Feenin'" is a song by American R&B group Jodeci, recorded for their second album, Diary of a Mad Band (1993). It was released as the second single from the album in March 1994.

Music video
The music video for "Feenin'", filmed in a mental asylum, was directed by Hype Williams and featured cameo appearances by Williams himself, Snoop Doggy Dogg and Treach from Naughty by Nature.

Track listing
 US promo Vinyl and 12"
"Feenin'" (Radio Version) - 4:14
"Feenin'" (E Double Gets Bizzy Mix) - 4:59
"Feenin'" (E Double Gets Bizz-e-r Mix) - 6:29
"Feenin'" (Get Bizzy Instrumental) - 4:06
"Feenin'" (Acapella) - 3:51

Personnel
Information taken from Discogs.
Producer: DeVante Swing
Remixer: Erick Sermon
Cedric "K-Ci" Hailey - Lead and Background vocals
Joel "JoJo" Hailey - Lead and Background vocals
DeVante Swing - Background vocals
Mr. Dalvin - Background vocals

Charts

Weekly charts

Year-end charts

Notes

1994 singles
Jodeci songs
Song recordings produced by DeVante Swing
Songs written by DeVante Swing
Music videos directed by Hype Williams
Uptown Records singles
MCA Records singles
1993 songs
Music Week number-one dance singles